Elvis Sex-Change is a compilation album by the British indie rock band Cornershop, released in 1993. It compiles the band's first two EPs In the Days of Ford Cortina and Lock Stock & Double Barrel.

Critical reception
Greil Marcus, in Artforum, wrote that the songs are "all blocked gestures and creative exhaustion, stumbling stabs at anger or love. It's music completely defined by its limits, and touching for just that quality."

Track listing 
All songs written by Ben Ayres, David Chambers, Avtar Singh and Tjinder Singh.
"Waterlogged" – 3:56
"Moonshine" – 2:30 
"Kawasaki (More Heat Than Chapati)" – 2:58 
"Hanif Kureishi Scene" – 3:25 
"England's Dreaming" – 3:36
"Trip Easy" – 2:59
"Summer Fun in a Beat Up Datsun" – 1:31
"Breaking Every Rule Language English" – 3:14

 Tracks 1 – 4 from the In the Days of Ford Cortina EP (1993)
 Tracks 5 – 8 from the Lock Stock & Double Barrel EP (1993)

Personnel 
 Tjinder Singh – vocals, bass, baja, dholki 
 Ben Ayres – guitar, vocals
 Avtar Singh – guitar
 David Chambers – drums, baja

Additional musicians
 Anthony "Saffs" Saffery – sitar
 Kulwant Ghakal – flute

Technical
 John Robb – production 
 Charlie – engineering
 Rex – engineering
 Kiran – drawings
 Jake – drawings

References

External links 
 Elvis Sex-Change at Discogs.com

1993 compilation albums
Cornershop albums
Wiiija albums